Rapture is a Christian hardcore punk band from San Francisco, California.

History
The band formed in 2014 with vocalist Richard Haro and guitarist Garrett Gutierrez in San Francisco. The two of them later found drummer Tony Rangel. The three continued looking for a bassist, until Gutierrez contacted his cousin, Isaac Guerrera, who became the band's bassist. The band has been compared to bands such as Sleeping Giant, Comeback Kid, Dynasty, Terror and xLooking Forwardx. The band released their debut EP, Trials, in 2015 through Thumper Punk Records. The band later signed to OnTheAttack Records and released their second EP, Persevere. In March 2017, the band released a single for their upcoming album Victory, titled "Once to Die". The band's debut album, Victory, was released through OnTheAttack in 2017.

Members
Current
 Richard Haro - vocals
 Garrett Gutierrez - guitars
 Isaac Guerrera - bass
 Tony Rangel - drums

Discography
EPs
 Trials (2015, Thumper Punk)
 Persevere (2016, OnTheAttack)

Singles
 "Once to Die" (2017)

Studio albums
 Victory (2017, OnTheAttack)
 Unburned (2018, OnTheAttack)

Compilation appearances
 Metal From The Dragon (Vol. 1) (2017; The Bearded Dragon Productions)

References

External links

Musical groups established in 2014
Musical groups from San Francisco
Christian hardcore musical groups
OnTheAttack Records artists
2014 establishments in California